The DeLorean Alpha5 is an upcoming battery electric sports car produced by the DeLorean Motor Company.

Overview
The Alpha5 was revealed on May 29, 2022.

The Alpha5 harkens back to its predecessor with its louvered rear window and gullwing doors. It is designed by Italdesign. It offers a full-width light strip on the back, and the DeLorean logo is also illuminated. While no DeLorean factory has been selected, the company announced that only 9,531 of the Alpha5 will be made, just one more than DMC built of the original DeLorean. CNET estimates a price around $125,000. The first concept car was revealed on August 29, 2022. The company expects those cars to be in production some time in 2024.

References

Upcoming car models
Electric sports cars
Cars introduced in 2022